Sniawbhalang Dhar is an Indian Politician of National People's Party from Meghalaya who is serving as the 4th Deputy Chief Minister of Meghalaya since 2023. He has been elected in Meghalaya Legislative Assembly from Nartiang constituency since 2013.He was also Minister of Commerce & Industries, Community & Rural Development, Soil & Water Conservation, Transport in First Conrad Sangma ministry from 2018 to 2023.

References 

Living people
National People's Party (India) politicians
Meghalaya MLAs 2018–2023
Year of birth missing (living people)
People from West Jaintia Hills district
Indian National Congress politicians from Meghalaya
Meghalaya MLAs 2023–2028